Operation Spartan Shield (OSS) is a USCENTCOM (United States Central Command) operation in the Middle East. OSS is commanded by United States Army Central and includes units from all service branches. Task Force Spartan is the U.S. Army component of OSS.

The 408th Contracting Support Brigade supports contracting requirements for Operation Spartan Shield, described in Army Lawyer as "USARCENT's steady state operation to Build Partner Capacity [that is, to conduct Capacity building) in the Middle East."

In Syria, on 25 August 2020, a Russian vehicle allegedly rammed a U.S. Mine Resistant Ambush Protected (MRAP) vehicle, which triggered an Operation Spartan Shield response.

Units
Divisional Headquarters
 4th Infantry Division until 2019
 42nd Infantry Division from March 2020 - November 2020. 
 36th Infantry Division from November 2020 - July 2021.
 29th Infantry Division from July 2021 - March 2022.
 35th Infantry Division from March 2022 - November 2022
Commands
 3rd Sustainment Command (Expeditionary) from August 2021 to May 2022
Combat Brigades
 2nd Brigade Combat Team, 1st Armored Division, was in Kuwait, now in Syria September 2020, to protect the troops there.
 155th Armored Brigade Combat Team, From June 2018 - March 2019. 
 69th Air Defense Artillery Brigade
 30th Armored Brigade Combat Team, From  Oct. 2019 - May 2020. Posted to Syria in late October for one month.
 75th Field Artillery Brigade from July 2020.
Support Brigades
 194th Theater Engineer Brigade from Oct 2019 to Aug 2020
 16th Theater Engineer Brigade from Aug 2020 to Apr 2021
 111th Theater Engineer Brigade from Apr 2021 to Nov 2021
 372nd Theater Engineer Brigade from Nov 2021 to Jul 2022
 926th Theater Engineer Brigade from Jul 2022 to Current
 7th Transportation Brigade
Battalions
 319th Expeditionary Signal Battalion, 505th Tactical Theater Signal Brigade, 335th Theater Signal Command from September 2021 to TBD
 156th Expeditionary Signal Battalion, 177th Military Police Brigade, 335th Theater Signal Command from May 2022 to TBD 
 3rd Ordnance Battalion (EOD)(Task Force Hell Hound) from April 2020
 198th Expeditionary Signal Battalion from August 2019 - July 2020
 146th Expeditionary Signal Battalion from June 2020 - TBD
 129th Combat Sustainment Support Battalion, 101st Division Sustainment Brigade, 101st Airborne Division from April 2019 to December 2019. 
  87th Combat Sustainment Support Battalion, 3rd Infantry Division Sustainment Brigade, 3rd Infantry Division from December 2019 to October 2020.
 1st Battalion, 501st Airborne Infantry Regiment, 4th Brigade Combat Team (Airborne), 25th Infantry Division from August 2017 to July 2018

Other units
 203d Inland Cargo Transfer Company, 457th Transportation Battalion, 644th Regional Support Group from December 2020 to August 2021
 1st Squadron, 102nd Cavalry Regiment, March 2019-Nov 2019
 D Forward Support Company (D FSC), 141st Brigade Support Battalion, 1st Squadron, 303rd Cavalry Regiment between November 2019 and July 2020
 352nd Civil Affairs Command (Forward), also known as, Civil Affairs Planning Team (CAPT), from July 2015 to present (?).  Attached to Army Central Command Headquarters (ARCENT), Camp Arifjan, Kuwait.
 626th Maintenance Company, 630th Combat Sustainment Support Battalion, 113th Sustainment Brigade between October 2019 and July 2020
 3666th Support Maintenance Company, 158th Combat Sustainment Support Battalion, 198th Regional Support Group "Desert Demons", Arizona Army National Guard, July 2020 to March 2021.
 228th Combat Support Hospital, 176th Medical Brigade, 807th Medical Command (Deployment Support) from September 2020 to Present
 Patrol Forces Southwest Asia (PATFORSWA) Combined Task Force 55.1, U.S. Coast Guard from September 2012 - present
 A Company, 1st Battalion, 157th Infantry Regiment, Colorado Army National Guard, January 2021-November 2021.

Aviation units

 4th Battalion, 501st Aviation Regiment (Combat Aviation Brigade, 35th Infantry Division) during March 2013.
 2nd Battalion, 135th Aviation Regiment (UH-60) from May 2015.
 1st Battalion (General Support), 168th Aviation Regiment (CH-47) between October 2015 and August 2016 (Combat Aviation Brigade, 40th Infantry Division).
 1st Battalion, 10th Aviation Regiment from April 2016.
 Company D, 1st Battalion, 140th Aviation Regiment (UH-60) from April 2016.
 Company A (AH-64 & UH-60), B, & D, 1st Battalion, 111th Aviation Regiment (CH-47) between February and October 2016 (77th Combat Aviation Brigade).
 2nd Battalion (General Support), 149th Aviation Regiment (CH-47) from February 2017.
 Company C, 2d Battalion (General Support), 211th Aviation Regiment attached to 1st Battalion (Assault Helicopter), 108th Aviation Regiment (Combat Aviation Brigade, 35th Infantry Division) during December 2018.

References

2010s in Kuwait
2010s in Jordan
2010s in Egypt
2010s in the United Arab Emirates
2010s in Saudi Arabia
2010s in Kazakhstan
Spartan Shield